Milady and the Musketeers (Italian: Il boia di Lilla, also known as Vengeance of the Musketeers and La vita avventurosa di Milady) is 1952 French-Italian historical adventure film directed by Vittorio Cottafavi and starring Rossano Brazzi, Yvette Lebon and Armando Francioli. It is based on the 1844 novel The Three Musketeers by Alexandre Dumas, and was a popular success.

The film's sets were designed by the art director Giancarlo Bartolini Salimbeni.

Cast
 Rossano Brazzi	as	Count de la Fere aka Athos
 Yvette Lebon	as	Milady Anne
 Armando Francioli	as 	Herbert de la Salle
 Maria Grazia Francia	as 	Gisèle
 Nerio Bernardi as Porthos 
 Massimo Serato	as	Rochefort
 Jean-Roger Caussimon as Mastro Pietro / Boia di Lilla  
 Raymond Cordy as Nobile
 Enzo Fiermonte		
 Vittorio Sanipoli		
 Renato De Carmine

References

Bibliography
 Moliterno, Gino. Historical Dictionary of Italian Cinema. Scarecrow Press, 2008.

External links
 

1952 films
1950s historical adventure films
Italian historical adventure films
French historical adventure films
1950s Italian-language films
Films directed by Vittorio Cottafavi
Films based on The Three Musketeers
Films set in the 1610s
Films set in the 1620s
Films set in France
Films set in Paris
Films scored by Renzo Rossellini
French black-and-white films
Italian black-and-white films
1950s Italian films
1950s French films